The following is a list of notable people who were born in the U.S. state of North Dakota, live (or lived) in North Dakota, or for whom North Dakota is (or was) a significant part of their identity.

A–F

Fred G. Aandahl (1897–1966) – Governor of North Dakota 1945–51; born in Barnes County
James A. Abrahamson (born 1933) – astronaut, Associate Director of NASA; born in Williston
Mark Andrews (1926–2020) – U.S. Senator 1981–87; born in Cass County
Reese Andy (born 1973) – mixed martial artist; born in Minot
Jennifer Baumgardner (born 1970) – journalist and author; born in Fargo
Carmen Berg (born 1963) – model and actress, 1987 Playboy Playmate; born in Bismarck
Leslie Bibb (born 1974) – actress, Talladega Nights, Iron Man, Popular; born in Bismarck
Elizabeth Bodine (1898–1986) – humanitarian; North Dakota Mother of the Year in 1968
Brooks Bollinger (born 1979) – NFL quarterback (New York Jets, Minnesota Vikings); born and raised in Grand Forks
Marcus Borg – theologian
Jeff Boschee (born 1979) – University of Kansas basketball player (1998–2002); born in Valley City
Paula Broadwell (born 1972) – bestselling author; extramarital partner of David Petraeus; born in Bismarck
Tom Brosseau – singer-songwriter and guitarist; born and raised in Grand Forks
Dale Brown (born 1935) – college basketball coach; born in Minot
Virginia Bruce (1910–1982) – singer and actress, Born to Dance, The Great Ziegfeld; raised in Fargo
Norman Brunsdale (1891–1978) – Governor 1951–57 and U.S. Senator; born in Steele County
James Buchli (born 1945) – astronaut; born in New Rockford
Quentin Burdick (1908–1992) – U.S. Senator; born in Munich
Sam Childers (born 1962) – former gang biker; founder, Angels of East located in Sudan; born in Grand Forks
Warren Christopher (1925–2011) – lawyer, U.S. Secretary of State 1993–97; born in Scranton
Alf Clausen (born 1941) – television and film orchestrater; grew up in Jamestown
Amanda Clement (1888–1971) – first female professional baseball umpire; born in Hudson
Kent Conrad (born 1948) – U.S. Senator 1992–2013; born in Bismarck
Chris Coste (born 1973) – Major League Baseball player; born in Fargo
Ronnie Cramer (1957-2021) – artist and film director; born in Bismarck
Angie Dickinson (born 1931) – Emmy and Golden Globe award-winning actress, Rio Bravo, Police Woman, Dressed to Kill; born in Kulm
Byron Dorgan (born 1942) – U.S. Senator 1992–2011; born in Dickinson
Josh Duhamel (born 1972) – actor, Las Vegas, Transformers; born in Minot
James M. Edie (1927–1998) – philosopher; born in Grand Forks
Richard Edlund (born 1940) – Academy Award-winning cinematographer, Raiders of the Lost Ark, original Star Wars trilogy; born in Fargo
Carl Ben Eielson – aviator; born in Hatton
Anthony W. England (born 1942) – NASA astronaut; raised in West Fargo
CariDee English (born 1984) – winner, cycle 7 of America's Next Top Model; host, television show Pretty Wicked; born in Fargo
Ron Erhardt (1931–2012) – college and New England Patriots football coach; born in Mandan
Darin Erstad (born 1974) – MLB baseball player (Anaheim Angels, Chicago White Sox, Houston Astros); born in Jamestown
Joe Clifford Faust (born 1957) – author; born in Williston
Marneen Fields (born 1955) – actress, pop singer, composer, stuntwoman; born in Minot
Michael Forest (born 1929) – actor, voice actor; born in Harvey
Hans Andersen Foss – editor; born in Norway; moved to Minot
Sally Fraser (1932–2019) – actress; born in Williston
Lynn Frazier (1874–1947) – Governor 1913–21 and U.S. Senator 1923–41; raised in Grafton
Phyllis Frelich (1944–2014)– actress; born in Devils Lake

G–K

William H. Gass (1924–2017) – writer; born in Fargo
James Getzlaff (born 1970) – reality-TV personality; born in Devils Lake
H. F. Gierke III (1943–2016) – 71st National Commander of The American Legion; Chief Judge of U.S. Court of Appeals for Armed Forces; born in Williston
William L. Guy (1919–2013) – Governor 1961–73; born in Devils Lake
Travis Hafner (born 1977) – MLB player (Cleveland Indians, New York Yankees); born in Jamestown
Gulbrand Hagen (1864–1919) – publisher; lived in Mayville
Patrick E. Haggerty (1914–1980) – engineer and businessman; co-founder, Texas Instruments; born in Harvey
Truck Hannah (1889–1982) – MLB player (New York Yankees), Pacific Coast League Hall of Fame; born in Larimore
Monica Hannan – news anchor and author, KFYR-TV
Phil Hansen (born 1968) – NFL player (Buffalo Bills); born in Oakes
Beverly Hanson (1924–2014) – professional golfer; born in Fargo
Tom Hatten (1926–2019) – film, radio/TV personality, born in Jamestown
Rick Helling (born 1970) – MLB player (Texas Rangers, Florida Marlins); born in Devils Lake
Kam Heskin (born 1973) – actress, Sunset Beach, Passions; born in Grand Forks
Clint Hill (born 1932) – United States Secret Service agent who was in the presidential motorcade during the assassination of John F. Kennedy
Virgil Hill (born 1964) – WBA champion boxer; from Grand Forks
Christopher Michael Holley (born 1971) – actor; born in Minot
Jeremy Horst (born 1985) – MLB player; raised in Des Lacs
Ken Hunt (1934–1997) – MLB player for New York Yankees, Los Angeles Angels; born in Grand Forks
Phil Jackson – NBA player; coach, Chicago Bulls and Los Angeles Lakers; president, New York Knicks; attended high school in Williston
Ben Jacobson (born 1970) – basketball head coach at Northern Iowa; born in Mayville
Leon O. Jacobson (1911–1992) – scientific researcher
Robert Jensen (born 1958) – educator; raised in Fargo
Gary Johnson (born 1953) – governor of New Mexico 1995–2003, presidential candidate; born in Minot
Harold Keith Johnson (1912–1983) – U.S. Army general; born in Bowesmont
Tim Johnson (born 1949) – baseball player, scout, manager of Toronto Blue Jays; born in Grand Forks
David C. Jones (1921–2013) – 9th Chairman of the Joint Chiefs of Staff; born in Aberdeen
Gordon Kahl – tax protestor; involved in Medina shootout
Rich Karlgaard – journalist; born in Bismarck
Woodrow W. Keeble (1917–1982) – U.S. Army (Wahpeton National Guard) Medal of Honor
Wiz Khalifa – rapper; born in Minot
Fred Kirschenmann – leader in the sustainable agriculture movement
Ev Kjelbertson (1935—2018) – football coach, born in Devils Lake
Jim Kleinsasser (born 1977) – NFL player (Minnesota Vikings); born in Carrington
Chuck Klosterman (born 1972) – author; grew up in Wyndmere; attended University of North Dakota
Dagny Knutson – swimmer; lived in Minot
Charlie Korsmo (born 1978) – actor, lawyer; born in Fargo
John Korsmo – politician who served as the chairman of the Federal Housing Finance Board

L–Q

Louis L'Amour (1908–1988) – western author; born in Jamestown
 CJ Lotzer, co-creator of CBOYSTV a YouTube channel amassing over 1 million subscribers.
Mark Landsberger (born 1955) – professional basketball player; born in Minot
Jonny Lang (born 1981) – Grammy Award-winning musician; born in Fargo
William Langer (1886–1959) – U.S. Senator and Governor of North Dakota; born in Casselton
Peggy Lee (1920–2002) – three-time Grammy Award-winning singer-songwriter; born in Jamestown
William Lemke (1878–1950) – state attorney general and U.S. Representative; raised in Towner County
Arthur A. Link (1914–2010) – Governor 1973–81; born in Alexander
Nicole Linkletter (born 1985) – fashion model, winner of America's Next Top Model cycle 5; born in Grand Forks
Kellan Lutz (born 1985) – actor; born in Dickinson
Francis D. Lyon – director and Oscar-winning film editor; born in Bowbells
Tyler Lyson – paleontologist; born and raised in Marmarth
Walter Maddock (1880–1951) – Lieutenant Governor and Governor; born in Grand Forks
Roger Maris (1934–1985) – baseball player; broke Babe Ruth home run record; grew up in Fargo
Jan Maxwell (1956–2018) – actress; born in Fargo
Kevin Miller (born 1977) – voice actor; born in Minot
Marquis de Morès – 19th-century land owner; originally from France
Cara Mund (born 1993) – Miss America 2018; born in Bismarck
Gerhard Brandt Naeseth (1913–1994) – founder of Norwegian-American Genealogical Center and Naeseth Library; born in Valley City
Steve Nelson (born 1951) – pro football player; attended North Dakota State
Sondre Norheim – pioneer of modern skiing; lived in McHenry County
Casper Oimoen (1906–1995) – ski jumper; originally from Norway; moved to Minot
John Olerud (born 1968) – baseball player; won two World Series championships with the Toronto Bluejays
Allen I. Olson (born 1938) – Governor 1981–85; born in Rolla
Lute Olson (1934–2020) – coach in College Basketball Hall of Fame; born in Mayville
Carleton Opgaard – educator; born in Fort Ransom
Gregory R. Page (born 1952) – executive chairman of Cargill; born in Bottineau
Ronald Paulson (born 1930) – educator; born in Bottineau
Leonard Peltier (born 1944) – American Indian activist and convicted murderer; born in Grand Forks
Arthur Peterson Jr. (1912–1996) – actor, Soap; born in Mandan
Amber Preston – stand-up comedian; born in Fargo
Adam Quesnell – stand-up comedian; lived in Fargo

R–Z

Aagot Raaen (1873–1957) – author and educator; lived near Hatton
Erik Ramstad (1860–1951) – a founder of Minot
Tom Rapp (1947–2018) – leader of band Pearls Before Swine; born in Bottineau
Greg Raymer (born 1964) – poker player; born in Minot
Clint Ritchie (1938–2009) – actor, One Life to Live; born in Grafton
Alan Ritchson (born 1984) – model, actor, Blue Mountain State; born in Grand Forks
James Rosenquist (1933–2017) – artist; born in Grand Forks
Ronda Rousey (born 1987) – UFC champion; raised in Jamestown
Sacagawea (1788–1812, or 1884) – guide; key to success of Lewis and Clark Expedition by helping establish ties with Native American tribes
Ed Schafer (born 1946) – Governor of North Dakota and U.S. Secretary of Agriculture; born in Bismarck
Harold Schafer (1912–2001) – businessman; born near Stanton
Donny Schatz (born 1977) – auto racer; World of Outlaws sprint car champion; born in Minot
Ed Schultz (1954–2018) – TV personality; worked in Fargo
Kyle Schweigert (born 1962) – football coach, University of North Dakota; born in Zeeland
Gary Serum (born 1956) – baseball player; born in Fargo
Eric Sevareid (1912–1992) – TV journalist; born in Velva
George F. Shafer (1888–1948) – Governor 1929–32; born in Mandan
Timm Sharp (born 1978) – actor; raised in Fargo
George A. Sinner (1928–2018) – Governor 1985–92; born in Fargo
Michael Soltis (born 1971) – actor; born in Minot
Arthur G. Sorlie (1874–1928) – Governor 1925–28; lived in Grand Forks
Ann Sothern (1909–2001) – actress in the Maisie films, A Letter to Three Wives, The Ann Sothern Show; born in Valley City
Richard St. Clair (born 1946) – composer; born in Jamestown
Rodney Stark (born 1934) – sociologist; born in Jamestown
Leslie Stefanson (born 1971) – artist, actress; born in Fargo
Shadoe Stevens (born 1947 as Terry Ingstad) – TV personality; born in Jamestown
Dorothy Stickney (1896–1998) – actress; born in Dickinson
Clyfford Still (1904–1980) – painter; born in Grandin
Matt Strahm (born 1991) – baseball player; born in West Fargo
Era Bell Thompson (1905–1986) – magazine editor; lived in Driscoll
Chris Tuchscherer (born 1975) – UFC heavyweight fighter; born in Rugby
Bobby Vee (1943–2016) – pop singer; born in Fargo
Harley Venton (born 1952) – actor; attended University of North Dakota
Mary Wakefield (born 1954) – deputy director, Department of Health and Human Services; from Devils Lake
Matthew Ward (born 1958) – singer; born in Grand Forks
Mimi Weddell (1915–2009) – actress; born in Williston
Sister Thomas Welder (1940–2020) – academic administrator and Benedictine nun; born in Linton, lived in Bismarck
Walter Welford (1868–1952) – Governor 1935–37; raised in Pembina
Lawrence Welk (1903–1992) – bandleader, entertainer, TV personality; born in Strasburg
Carson Wentz (born 1992) – quarterback, NDSU and Philadelphia Eagles; born in Bismarck
Gabby West (born 1985) – actress; attended North Dakota State
Natalie West (born 1956) – actress; born in Grand Forks
Frank E. Wheelock (1863–1932) – founder and first mayor, Lubbock, Texas; reared in North Dakota
Frank White (1856–1940) – Governor 1901–05 and U.S. Treasury Secretary; lived in Valley City
Larry Woiwode (born 1941) – poet and novelist; born in Carrington
Milton Young (1897–1983) – U.S. Senator 1948–81; born in Berlin

See also

By educational institution affiliation

 List of North Dakota State Bison head football coaches
 List of presidents of North Dakota State University
 List of University of North Dakota people

By location

 List of people from Fargo, North Dakota
 List of people from Grand Forks, North Dakota

By public office

 List of lieutenant governors of North Dakota
 List of governors of North Dakota
 List of justices of the North Dakota Supreme Court
 List of majority leaders of the North Dakota House of Representatives
 List of speakers of the North Dakota House of Representatives
 List of United States presidential electors from North Dakota
 List of United States representatives from North Dakota
 List of United States senators from North Dakota

Other

 List of North Dakota suffragists
 Lists of Americans

References